Pursley may refer to:
Pursley, West Virginia
Greg Pursley
Leo Aloysius Pursley
Tricia Pursley
Purslane